Articolla cyclidias is a moth of the family Tortricidae first described by Edward Meyrick in 1907. It is found in Sri Lanka.

References

Grapholitini
Moths of Asia
Moths described in 1907
Taxa named by Edward Meyrick